Mother Heroine (Mat'-geroinya) is an honorary title that was used in the Soviet Union and now Russia, awarded for bearing and raising a large family. The state's intent was not only to honor such large families, but also to increase financial assistance for pregnant women, mothers of large families, and single mothers, and to promote an increased level of health in mother and child. The award was established in 1944 and continued to exist until the fall of the Soviet Union in 1991. On 15 August 2022 Vladimir Putin signed a decree reviving the honorary title.

Award history

The honorary title "Mother Heroine" was established on 8 July 1944 by Decree of the Presidium of the Supreme Soviet.  Its statute, including multiple increases in available state pensions for these families or single mothers, was amended 15 times from its original establishment until the last amendment contained in Decree number 20 of the Presidium of the Supreme Soviet of 7 May 1986.

Award statute
The honorary title "Mother Heroine" was awarded to mothers bearing and raising 10 or more children. The title was accompanied by the bestowal of the Order "Mother Heroine" and a certificate conferred by the Presidium of the Supreme Soviet of the Soviet Union. It was awarded upon the first birthday of the last child, provided that nine other children (natural or adopted) remained alive. Children who had perished under heroic, military or other respectable circumstances, including occupational diseases, were also counted. The award was created simultaneously with the Order of Maternal Glory (Russian: Орден "Материнская слава") and the Maternity Medal (Russian: Медаль материнства), intended for women with five to nine children.

They were also entitled to a number of privileges in terms of retirement pension, the payment of public utility charges, and the supply of food and other goods.

Approximately 430,000 women were awarded this title during its existence.

If worn with honorary titles of the Russian Federation, the latter have precedence.

Award description
The honorary title "Mother Heroine" entitled the recipient to wear the Order "Mother Heroine", which was a gold star with silver straight rays between the arms forming an inverted pentagon; it was suspended by a silver-plated ring through the suspension loop to a metallic, red-enamelled scroll-shaped mount bearing the gilt relief inscription, "MOTHER HEROINE".

Post-Soviet awards
Following the dissolution of the Soviet Union in 1991, the award was abolished in most post-Soviet republics.
 In Russia, it was abolished in 1991 but replaced in 2008 with the Order of Parental Glory. In 2022, Russian president Vladimir Putin proposed to revive the title of Mother Heroine and introduce a payment of one million rubles.
 In Tajikistan, it was withdrawn in 1996 to discourage large families.
 In Ukraine, it was cancelled upon independence but restored in 2001.
 In Kazakhstan, mothers of 10 or more children have since 1995 been awarded the Altyn Alka (Алтын алка, "Golden pendant") and mothers of eight or nine children have received the Kumis Alka (Кумiс алка, "Silver pendant").

See also

 List of awards honoring women
 Orders, decorations, and medals of the Soviet Union
 Order of Maternal Glory
 Order of Parental Glory Russian Federation
 "Mother Heroine" Title (Albania)
 Order of Mother, Belarus
 Cross of Honour of the German Mother
 Médaille de la Famille française
 Family in the Soviet Union

References

Орден "Мать-героиня" at Ordena i Medali SSSR

External links
  Legal Library of the USSR

Natalism
Honorary titles of the Soviet Union
Civil awards and decorations of the Soviet Union
Orders, decorations, and medals for women
Awards established in 1944
Awards disestablished in 1991
1991 disestablishments in the Soviet Union
Demographics of the Soviet Union
Hero (title)